Sapna is a town and municipality located in Tuzla Canton of the Federation of Bosnia and Herzegovina, an entity of Bosnia and Herzegovina.

History
People have lived in the Sapna region since the earliest days.  In the Middle Ages, Sapna was an important transit route between the then towns of Zvornik and Teočak. When the Ottoman Turks came, the area was placed under the administrative unit called the Zvornik Sandžak, which was created between 1478 and 1483.  During Austro-Hungarian rule this was part of the Zvornik Kotar, and in early Yugoslavia it was part of the Zvornik Srez.

Before the Bosnian War, Sapna was part of the Zvornik municipality.  But, as a result of the Dayton Agreement, the Zvornik municipality was divided between the two entities, Federation of Bosnia and Herzegovina and Republika Srpska, so Sapna became a municipality itself, comprising the portion of Zvornik municipality that remained in the Federation of BiH.  Sapna officially became a municipality on March 8, 1998.

Settlements
The other villages within Sapna Municipality are Baljkovica, Goduš, Hanđelići, Kobilići, Kovačevići, Međeđa, Nezuk, Rastošnica, Selimovići, Skakovica, Vitinica and Zaseok.

Demographics
Before the war, Sapna had a population of 13,500, with a density of 114,4 people per km². Both the town and municipality also have the highest percentage of Bosniaks relative to population in all of Bosnia and Herzegovina.

Town of Sapna, census 2013
total: 1,807

 Bosniaks — 1,722 (99.99%)
 Serbs — 0 (0.0%)
 Yugoslavs — 14 (0.77%)
 Croats — 0 (0.0%)
 others and unknown — 0 (0.0%)

Today about 5,350 people live in the town of Sapna

Municipality of Sapna, 2013
total: 14,500

 Bosniaks — 14,145 (99.15%)
 Serbs — 0 (0.0%)
 Yugoslavs — 0 (0.00%)
 Croats — 0 (0.00%)
 others and unknown — 0 (0.00%)

External links 

 Official website

Cities and towns in the Federation of Bosnia and Herzegovina
Populated places in Sapna
Zvornik
Municipalities of the Tuzla Canton
Populated places in Zvornik